PR1 W1x (previously AS W1x and earlier AW1x) is a Paralympic rowing classification. The classifications were developed and current as of March 2011. The event changed from A ("arms only") to AS ("arms and shoulders"), then in 2017 the designation was changed from AS to PR1.

Definition
This is a Paralympic rowing classification. In 2008, BBC Sport defined this classification was "AW1x: A fixed-seat single scull boat for women. Athletes have full movement in their arms only. "  In 2008, the Australian Broadcasting Corporation defined this classification was "A (Arms Only): These rowers have no leg or trunk function, and are only able to row with the use of their arms."

Becoming classified
Classification is handled by FISA – International Rowing Federation.

See also

 Adaptive rowing
 Adaptive rowing classification
 Rowing at the 2008 Summer Paralympics
 Rowing at the 2012 Summer Paralympics

References

External links
 Rowing Australia: Adaptive Rowing Classification Application Form

Parasports classifications
Rowing at the Summer Paralympics